William Howland (1823 – 1905) was a reformer and merchant in Sherwood, New York. He served in the 106th New York State Legislature.

Biography 
William Penn Howland was born in 1823 to Slocum and Hannah Tallcot Howland, who were prominent in the Society of Friends. His sister Emily Howland and daughter Isabel Howland were strong supporters of women's rights. His father left a large inheritance in 1881 and he was able to invest in business. He went on to serve in the 106th New York State Assembly where he championed woman's rights.

References 

1823 births
1905 deaths
Members of the New York State Assembly
19th-century American politicians